Minas Gerais is a state in Southeastern Brazil. It ranks as the second most populous, the third by gross domestic product (GDP), and the fourth largest by area in the country. The state's capital and largest city, Belo Horizonte (literally "Beautiful Horizon"), is a major urban and finance center in Latin America, and the sixth largest municipality in Brazil and its metropolitan area is the third largest in Brazil with just over 5.8 million inhabitants, after those of São Paulo and Rio de Janeiro. Nine Brazilian presidents were born in Minas Gerais, the most of any state. The state has 10.1% of the Brazilian population and is responsible for 8.7% of the Brazilian GDP.

With an area of —larger than Metropolitan France—it is the fourth most extensive state in Brazil. The main producer of coffee and milk in the country, Minas Gerais is known for its heritage of architecture and colonial art in historical cities such as São João del-Rei, Congonhas, Ouro Preto, Diamantina, Tiradentes, Mariana, Sabará and Serro. In the south, the tourist points are the hydro-mineral spas, such as Caxambu, Lambari, São Lourenço, Poços de Caldas, São Thomé das Letras, Monte Verde (a district of the municipality of Camanducaia) and the national parks of Caparaó and Canastra. The landscape of the state is marked by mountains, valleys, and large areas of fertile lands. In the Serra do Cipó, Sete Lagoas, Cordisburgo and Lagoa Santa, the caves and waterfalls are the attractions. Some of Brazil's most famous caves are located there.

Etymology
Two interpretations are given for the origin of the name Minas Gerais.  It comes from "Minas dos Matos Gerais", the former name of the colonial province ("Mines of the General Woods").

The first interpretation is that the name simply means "General Mines", with the word Gerais serving as an adjective to the mines, which were themselves spread in several spots around a larger region. 

The second interpretation is that this ignores the two large geographical spaces which conformed the state in its history: the region of the mines (Minas), and the region of the Gerais ("Matos Gerais" or "Campos Gerais", which means something close to "General Fields"). These corresponded to the areas of sertão which were farther and hard to access (with an economy based on farming and agriculture) from the mining spots (whose economic space was urban from its origin).

The confusion comes from the fact that the term "Gerais" is taken as an adjective to "Minas" in the first version, although according to this point of view it refers to the region called Gerais (as a noun). A further complication is that this is not a well-defined area on the map of the state, but rather a designation to these parts outside the mining spots, more related to the geography of Sertão, and more isolated from the state's nucleus.

Location

Minas Gerais is in the north of the southeast region of Brazil, which also contains the states of São Paulo, Rio de Janeiro and Espírito Santo. It borders Bahia (north), Goiás (west and northwest), Mato Grosso do Sul (far west), the states of São Paulo and Rio de Janeiro (south) and the state of Espírito Santo (east). It also shares a short boundary with the Federal District (northwest). Minas Gerais is situated between 14°13'58" and 22°54'00" S latitude and between 39°51'32" and 51°02'35" W longitude. It is larger in area than Metropolitan France or Spain.

Geography

Minas Gerais features some of the longest rivers in Brazil, most notably the São Francisco, the Paraná and to a lesser extent, the Doce river. The state also holds many hydroelectric power plants, including Furnas. Some of the highest peaks in Brazil are in the mountain ranges in the southern part of the state, such as the Mantiqueira Mountains and Serra do Cervo, that mark the border between Minas and its neighbors São Paulo and Rio de Janeiro. The most notable one is the Bandeira peak, the third highest mountain in Brazil at 2,890 m, standing on the border with Espírito Santo state. The state also has huge reserves of iron and sizeable reserves of gold and gemstones, including emerald, topaz and aquamarine mines. Emeralds found in this location are comparable to the best Colombia-origin emeralds, and are most often a bluish-green color.

Each region of the state has a distinct character, geographically and to a certain extent culturally.

 The central and eastern area of the state is hilly and rocky, with little vegetation on the mountains. Around Lagoa Santa and Sete Lagoas a typical Karst topography with caves and lakes is found. Some of the mountains are almost entirely iron ore, which led to extensive mining. About  to the east of Belo Horizonte is the second Metropolitan Region of the state, Vale do Aço (Steel Valley), which has iron and steel processing companies along the course of the Doce river and its tributaries. Vale do Aço's largest cities are Ipatinga, Coronel Fabriciano and Timóteo. The city of Governador Valadares is in the limit of this region with the North.
 The south of Minas Gerais is hilly and green, with coffee and milk production. This region is notably colder than the rest of the state, and some locations are subject to temperatures just below the freezing point during the winter. The region is also famed for its mineral-water resorts, including the cities of Poços de Caldas, Lambari, São Lourenço and Caxambu. Many industries are located at Varginha and Pouso Alegre.
 The southeast of the state, called Zona da Mata, was the richest region until the mid 20th century, nowadays the biggest city, Juiz de Fora, remains an important industrial, cultural and educational center, being also the fourth largest in Minas Gerais. The day-to-day living in the Zona da Mata however, is better represented by a group of smaller cities like Manhuaçu, Além Paraíba, Viçosa, Leopoldina, Cataguases, Muriaé, Ubá, Astolfo Dutra and several others. Those cities put together form a strong economic presence based mostly on agriculture, textiles and minerals. The city of the principal coffee region in Minas Gerais is São João do Manhuaçu situated in Zona da Mata.
 The west of Minas Gerais, also known as "Triângulo Mineiro" (which means "the Minas Triangle", due to the geographic shape of this region), is composed of a particular type of savanna, known as the cerrado. This region was initially occupied by large free-wheeling beef ranches, which are still important for the economy of the region. Over the 1990s, extensive soy and corn farms occupied much of the farming land available. The cerrado is also one of the principal coffee-growing areas of Brazil. The main cities of this region are Uberlândia, Uberaba, Patos de Minas and Araguari.
 The north of Minas Gerais is part of the arid sertão of the northeast region, and is thus subject to frequent droughts. Recent irrigation projects use the water from the São Francisco river for agriculture; the river crosses the northern region carrying water from its basin in the central area of the state, which is subject to a regular rainfall pattern. The diamond mines of this region, mainly in Diamantina, attracted miners but are now exhausted, and the remaining population lives in poor conditions, especially in the valley of the Jequitinhonha River. The region is, however, known for its high quality cachaça production. Salinas in particular exports large amounts of this alcoholic beverage. The main cities of this region are Montes Claros, Teófilo Otoni, Pirapora and Janaúba.

Modern geographic division by IBGE (2017) 
According to the modern (2017) geographic classification by Brazil's National Institute of Geography and Statistics (IBGE), which succeeded the division in mesoregions and microregions (1988), the state is now divided in 13 intermediate geographic regions, each one divided in immediate geographic regions (70 total in the whole state):

 Intermediate Geographic Region of Belo Horizonte
 Intermediate Geographic Region of Patos de Minas
 Intermediate Geographic Region of Montes Claros
 Intermediate Geographic Region of Teófilo Otoni
 Intermediate Geographic Region of Governador Valadares
 Intermediate Geographic Region of Ipatinga
 Intermediate Geographic Region of Barbacena
 Intermediate Geographic Region of Juiz de Fora
 Intermediate Geographic Region of Divinópolis
 Intermediate Geographic Region of Varginha
 Intermediate Geographic Region of Pouso Alegre
 Intermediate Geographic Region of Uberaba
 Intermediate Geographic Region of Uberlândia

Geology

Paleontology

The discovery of the Maxakalisaurus topai (Dinoprata) fossils was a significant paleontological find. The fossil is a genus of titanosaurid dinosaur found 45 kilometers (28 mi) from the city of Prata, in the state of Minas Gerais in 1998. It was closely related to Saltasaurus, a sauropod considered unusual because it had evolved apparently defensive traits, including bony plates on its skin and vertical plates along its spine; such osteoderms have also been found for Maxakalisaurus. The genus name is derived from the tribe of the Maxakali.

The Maxakalisaurus fossils belonged to an animal about 13 meters (43.3 ft) long, with an estimated weight of 9 tons, although, according to paleontologist Alexander Kellner, it could reach a length of approximately 20 meters (65 ft). It had a long neck and tail, ridged teeth (unusual among sauropods) and lived about 80 million years ago. Because sauropods seem to have lacked significant competition in South America, they evolved there with greater diversity and more unusual traits than elsewhere in the world. A replica has been displayed at the Museu Nacional in Rio de Janeiro, since August 28, 2006.

History

Indigenous inhabitation 

The region of Minas Gerais was inhabited by indigenous peoples as long ago as 11,400 to 12,000 years ago, based on the estimated age of the Luzia woman, the name of the oldest human fossil found in the Americas. Luzia was found in excavations in Lapa Vermelha, a cave in the region of Lagoa Santa and Pedro Leopoldo, in the Metropolitan Region of Belo Horizonte. In the region of the municipalities of Januária, Montalvânia, Itacarambi and Juvenília, in the north of Minas Gerais, archaeological excavations have led to estimates that the initial settlement occurred between 11,000 and 12,000 years ago. Starting in this period, cultural characteristics emerged, such as the use of stone or bone, the creation of cemeteries and small grain silos, as well as cave paintings. Later, about four thousand years ago, it is speculated that vegetable cultivation occurred, in particular corn, and that two thousand years ago, ceramic products were already being manufactured.

The discovery of Luzia in the 1970s led to the hypothesis that the settlement of the Americas was begun with the migration of hunter gatherers from Asia, probably through the Bering Strait, by way of a land bridge called Beringia (which was left by the recession of the sea during the last ice age). The indigenous peoples of Minas Gerais, as well as throughout Brazil and South America, are descendants of the groups who migrated there through North America.

More than a hundred indigenous groups inhabited the state of Minas Gerais. The region was occupied until the 16th century by indigenous peoples of the Macro-Jê linguistic stock such as the Xakriabá, the Maxakali, the Crenaques, the Aranãs, the Mocurins, the Atu-auá-araxás and the Purí. A few decades after Portuguese colonization, however, they became targets of enslavement, and were, for centuries, captured by Bandeirantes to work on their farms or to be sold; those who revolted were subject to genocide. There are currently five groups: the Xakriabá, the Crenaques, the Maxakalis, the Pataxós and the Pankararus.

Colonial era 

In the colonial era, the Brazilian interior was colonized by Portuguese and bandeirantes. The Brazilian gold rush ushered in an influx of new settlers in search of veins of gold (discovered 1693) and gems, and later diamonds which come from the naturally occurring itacolumite rock that can be found in great numbers in the Iron Quadrangle region. These helped to boost occupation of the inner lands and led to the foundation of several new villages. In 1697, the Portuguese used enslaved African labor to start building the Estrada Real, the "royal road," that would connect the ports of cities of Rio de Janeiro and Paraty to the mineral-rich regions of Ouro Preto, Serro, and, at the northernmost point, Diamantina. In 1753 Rosa Egipcíaca was enslaved and forced to work as a prostitute in a mine in the region, until she became ill and began to have religious visions. These visions led to her arrest and imprisonment and ultimately interrogation by the Inquisition. She recorded them in the first book to be written by a black woman in Brazil — Sagrada Teologia do Amor Divino das Almas Peregrinas.

Prior to 1720, Minas Gerais was part of the captaincy of São Vicente (later renamed São Paulo e Minas de Ouro). The first capital of Minas Gerais, and seat of the local see, was the city of Mariana; it was later moved to Vila Rica. In the late 18th century, Vila Rica was the largest city in Brazil and one of the most populous in the Americas. As the gold mines were exhausted over the 19th century, the city lost its importance; it was later renamed Ouro Preto and remained the state capital until the construction of the all-new, planned city of Belo Horizonte at the turn of the 20th century. The gold cycle left its mark in cities such as Mariana, Ouro Preto, Diamantina, Sabará, Tiradentes and São João del-Rei. The relative isolation from European influence, added to the huge influx of gold and other valuable minerals, helped the local people to develop their own style of art, which became known as Barroco Mineiro. Prime examples of this period are the richly decorated churches in the colonial cities. The most important artist of this period was Antônio Francisco Lisboa, who became known as Aleijadinho. His sculptural and architectural work, as exhibited in the Twelve Prophets and The Church of Saint Francis of Assisi in Ouro Preto, are highly valued by experts as one of the most refined artistic expressions outside Europe at that time.

In addition to art and architecture, there was an explosion of musical activity in Minas Gerais in the 18th century. Printed copies of European music, as well as accomplished musicians, made the journey to the area, and soon a local school of composition and performance was born and achieved considerable sophistication. Several composers worked in Minas Gerais in the 18th century, mainly in Vila Rica (now Ouro Preto), Sabará, Mariana, and other cities. Some of the names which have survived include José Joaquim Emerico Lobo de Mesquita, Marcos Coelho Neto, Francisco Gomes da Rocha and Ignácio Parreiras Neves; they cultivated a style related to the classical European style but marked by more a more chordal, homophonic sound, and they usually wrote for mixed groups of voices and instruments.

Guimarães Rosa's literature is mostly situated in Minas Gerais, with locations widely located across the State (hence the term General, although more concentrated in its north) rather than delimited and identifiable. This northern area began to be colonized (with brutal conflicts with the large Amerindian population who lived in some parts, especially in Vale do Jequitinhonha) and became accessible to colonists departing from Bahia up north, which made the Portuguese crown insert the region within the state of Minas Gerais's borders in order to prevent gold and diamond smuggling from people trying to avoid colonial taxation and oversight; thus the captaincy of Minas Gerais was closely watched by the crown because of its tax revenue.

During the 18th century, mining exploration was strongly controlled by the Portuguese Crown, which imposed heavy taxes on everything extracted (one fifth of all gold would go to the Crown). Several rebellions were attempted by the colonists, always facing strong reaction by the imperial crown. One of the most important was the Vila Rica revolt that ended with the execution of Filipe dos Santos, the revolt's leader, but also with the separation of Minas Gerais from the captaincy São Paulo e Minas de Ouro. The most notable one, however, was the Minas Gerais conspiracy, started in 1789 by a group of middle-class colonists, mostly intellectuals and young officers. They were inspired by the American and French Enlightenment ideals. The conspiracy failed and the rebels were arrested and exiled. The most famous of them, Joaquim José da Silva Xavier (known as Tiradentes), was hanged by order of Queen Maria I of Portugal, becoming a local hero and a national martyr of Brazil. The Minas Gerais flag—a red triangle on a white background, along with the Latin motto "Libertas quæ sera tamen", "freedom albeit late"—is based on the design for the national flag proposed by the "Inconfidentes", as the rebels became known.

In the economic history of Brazil, Minas Gerais plays a pivotal role in shifting the economic axis from the Brazilian northeast (based on sugarcane, that starts declining in the 18th century) to the southeast of the country, which still remains the major economic center. The large amounts of gold found in the region attracted the attention of Portugal back to Brazil, progressively turning Rio de Janeiro into an important port city, from where these would be shipped to Portugal and where the Portuguese crown would eventually move its administration in 1808 after Napoleon Bonaparte's invasion of Portugal (see Transfer of the Portuguese Court to Brazil).

Due to the economic importance of the state and the particular traits of the local population—famed for its reserved and balanced character—Minas Gerais has also played an important role on national politics. During the 19th century, politicians such as José Bonifácio de Andrada e Silva were instrumental in the establishment of the Brazilian Empire under the rule of Pedro I and later his son, Pedro II. After the installation of the First Brazilian Republic, during the early 20th century, Minas Gerais shared the control of the national political scene with São Paulo in what became known as the "coffee with milk politics" (coffee being the major product of São Paulo, and milk representing Minas Gerais' dairy industry, despite the latter also being an important coffee producer).

Minas Gerais was also home to two of the most influential Brazilian politicians of the second half of the 20th century. Juscelino Kubitschek was president from 1956 to 1961, and he was responsible for the construction of Brasília as the new capital of Brazil. Tancredo Neves had an extensive political career that culminated with his election in 1984 to be the first civil president after the 1964 military coup. However, he died after a series of health complications just as he was about to assume the position. Also, Itamar Franco, former president of Brazil, lived there, though he was not born in Minas Gerais.

Gallery

Demographics

According to the IBGE of 2008, there were 19,765,000 people residing in the state. Urbanization: 85% (2006); Population growth: 1.4% (1991–2000); Houses: 5,741,000 (2006).

The last PNAD (National Research for Sample of Domiciles) census revealed the following numbers: 9,091,000 White people (46%), 8,927,000 Brown (Multiracial) people (45%), 1,802,000 Black people (9%), 40,000 Asian people (0.2%), 37,000 Amerindian people (0.2%).

Ethnic groups found in Minas Gerais include: Amerindians, Portuguese, Africans, Italians, Germans and Lebanese.

The ethnic composition of the population varies from town to town. For example, in Córrego do Bom Jesus, a small town located in the extreme south of Minas Gerais, White people make up 98.7% of the population. The South of Minas Gerais is both the most European and the most densely populated part of the state. On the other hand, in Setubinha, located in the northeast part of the state, 71.8% are mixed-race and 14.7% Black. It is historically explainable: southern Minas Gerais, in the border with São Paulo, received larger numbers of Portuguese farmers in colonial times. In the late 19th century, Italian immigrants also arrived. The north region, close to Bahia, was a place to the arrival of many African slaves since the 18th century. The central part of the state, where the capital Belo Horizonte is, has a more balanced ratio between White, Black and mixed people.

The population of Minas Gerais is the result of an intense mixture of peoples, particularly between Black Africans and Portuguese. In colonial Minas Gerais, the population was divided in five different categories: Whites, mostly Portuguese; Africans, who often did not have a surname and were usually known for their region of origin (for example Francisca Benguela would refer to Benguela); Crioulos (Black people born in Brazil, usually to both African parents); Mulattoes (people of mixed Black and White ancestry, usually born to a Black mother and a Portuguese father) and Cabras (people of mixed ancestry, usually with high degree of Amerindian admixture). Black people and "Mulattoes" predominated in the population after the beginning of the colonization. By the 19th century, however, whites were already the largest single group in the Minas Gerais population. Taking the population as a whole (all groups included), European genes account for the majority of the Minas Gerais genetic heritage, which has been explained on the basis of the extremely high mortality rates of the enslaved African population and lower reproductive rate of African slaves (the vast majority of them were males, among other reasons for their lower reproductive success). The Amerindian population was hit hard by the diseases brought by the European colonists and they did not have much of an impact either, especially in Minas Gerais, where European presence and colonization was massive.

During the colonial period, the disproportion between the number of men and women was quite sharp. The census of 1738 in Serro do Frio, which included Diamantina, revealed that of the 9,681 inhabitants, 83.5% were men and 16.5% women. Among the slaves, women were only 3.1%. The number of free "women of color" (Black and "Mulatto") was very high. The same census revealed that 63% of the former slaves were women and only 37% men. Since interracial relationships between "women of color" and White men were widespread, the female slaves were more likely to be freed than the male slaves.

The monogamous family structure that the Catholic Church tried to deploy in colonial Brazil was the exception in Minas Gerais. At that time cohabitation and temporary relationships predominated in Minas Gerais, as well as in Brazil as a whole. Monogamy and weddings in churches would only take root in Brazil in the 19th century, fitting the moral standards imposed by the Church. The role of women in colonial Minas Gerais was much more dynamic than it would be allowed by the standards of the time. Many women used to live on their own, were heads of family and worked, particularly the "women of color" and former slaves. The society of Minas Gerais provided a great social mobility to former slaves, mainly for women. In Tejuco, the percentage of White males who were head of family (37.7%) was very similar to the percentage of Black women who were head of family (38.5%). Many former slaves were able to accumulate goods and many of them became slave owners as well. Some Black people and mainly Mulattos were able to integrate themselves in the highest social stratum of the society of Minas Gerais, once restricted to Whites. This happened through a process of "whitening" their descendence and through the assimilation of the culture of the White elite, like being members of Catholic brotherhoods.

Cohabitation was the most common crime in Minas Gerais. The Catholic Church was strict in the punishment of this crime, in order to prevent the widespread miscegenation between White, mostly Portuguese males with Black or Mulatto women.

According to a 2013 autosomal DNA study, the ancestral composition of the state of Minas Gerais can be described as: 59.20% European, 28.90% African and 11.90% Native American 

During the time of the gold rush, thousands of Portuguese immigrated to Brazil (mainly from the Minho), and many of them to Minas Gerais, the place where the gold rush activities took place. Most of them came from Entre Douro e Minho, in Northern Portugal. The reference book for a large number of these families is "Velhos Troncos Mineiros" (Old Mineiro Branches) by Raimundo Trindade. The Native American population of Minas Gerais was estimated to be at 97,000 in 1500, by the time the Portuguese arrived in Brazil in 1500 (John Hemming in "Red Gold: The Conquest of the Brazilian Indians").

The ancestry of the Africans brought to Minas Gerais was both West African and Bantu, with a predominance of the former initially and a predominance of the latter later.

Major cities

Religion

According to the 2010 Brazilian Census, most of the population (13.8 million people) consider themselves to be Catholic, which puts the state in ninth place when considering the percentage of the population belonging to this religion (70.4%). Although the number of Catholics has been gradually decreasing in recent years, Roman Catholicism is still strongly rooted in the Culture of Minas Gerais, but religious pluralism has also grown in recent years.

Language 
The dialect known as mineiro is spoken by half of the population, mainly in the center and east of the state. The south and west speak caipira. The north, baiano.

Education

Minas Gerais is home to some of the best schools in the country, both at the secondary and higher levels. It is also the state that contains the largest number of Federal Universities, public universities maintained directly by the federal government.

Main educational institutions

 Universidade do Estado de Minas Gerais (UEMG) (State University of Minas Gerais)
 Universidade Federal de Minas Gerais (UFMG) (Federal University of Minas Gerais)
 Universidade Federal de Uberlândia (UFU) (Federal University of Uberlandia)
 Universidade Federal de Lavras (UFLA) (Federal University of Lavras)
 Universidade Federal de Ouro Preto (UFOP) (Federal University of Ouro Preto)
 Universidade Federal de Viçosa (UFV) (Federal University of Viçosa)
 Universidade Federal de Juiz de Fora (UFJF) (Federal University of Juiz de Fora)
 Universidade Federal de Itajuba (Unifei) (Federal University of Itajuba)
 Universidade Federal de São João del-Rei (UFSJ) (Federal University of São João del-Rei)
 Universidade Federal do Triângulo Mineiro (UFTM) (Federal University of Triangulo Mineiro)
 Universidade Federal dos Vales do Jequitinhonha e Mucuri (UFVJM) (Federal University of Jequitinhonha and Mucuri Valleys)
 Universidade Federal de Alfenas (Unifal-MG) (Federal University of Alfenas)
 Centro Federal de Educação Tecnológica de Minas Gerais (CEFET-MG) (Federal Center for Technological Education of Minas Gerais)
 Pontifícia Universidade Católica de Minas Gerais (PUC-MG) (Pontifical Catholic University of Minas Gerais)
 Faculdade de Ciências Medicas de Minas Gerais (FCMMG) (Minas Gerais' School of Medical Sciences)
 Universidade Estadual de Montes Claros (Unimontes) (State University of Montes Claros)
 Escola Preparatória de Cadetes do Ar (EPCAr) (Preparatory School for Air Cadets)
 Colégio Técnico/UFMG (Coltec)
 Colégio Aplicação/UFV
 Colégio Militar de Belo Horizonte (CMBH) (Belo Horizonte Military School)

Economy

Minas Gerais is the second-largest consumer market in Brazil, behind the state of São Paulo. It shares 10.4% of the Brazilian consumer market. Companies of this Brazilian state have access to 49% of the Brazilian consumer market, with estimated consumption potential of 223 billion US dollars. The service sector is the largest component of GDP at 47.1%, followed by the industrial sector at 44.1%. agriculture represents 8.8% of GDP (2004). Main exports: mineral products 44.4%, metals 15.8%, vegetable products 13%, precious metals 5.5%, foodstuffs 4.9%, transportation 3.5% (2012).

Its share of the Brazilian economy in 2005 was 9%. 
Minas Gerais had an industrial GDP of R $128.4 billion in 2017, equivalent to 10.7% of the national industry. It employs 1,069,469 workers in the industry. The main industrial sectors are: construction (17.9%), extraction of metallic minerals (15.2%), food (13.4%), industrial services of public utility, such as electricity and water (10.8%) and metallurgy (10.5%). These 5 sectors concentrate 67.8% of the state's industry.

Minas Gerais is a major producer of milk, coffee and other agricultural commodities, as well as minerals. The state has marked economic divisions. The southern part of the state (close to the São Paulo and Rio de Janeiro state borders) has several mid-sized cities with solid industrial bases such as Juiz de Fora, Varginha, Pouso Alegre, and Poços de Caldas, as well as Ipatinga in the east of the state, which is also a modern and major industrial city and Itabira, considered mother city of mining company Vale, that has stocks quoted in Bovespa and NYSE. The northeastern region is marked by poverty, but Governador Valadares and Teófilo Otoni attract foreign traders for the semi-precious gems such as topaz and sapphire. In Teófilo Otoni, some companies are also attracted because of Brazilian Export Processing Zone, a free trade area.

Agriculture

The western part, the "Triângulo Mineiro", is less densely populated than the rest of the state, and it is now a focus of biotechnology investment, particularly on the cities of Uberlândia, Uberaba, Patos de Minas and Araguari, which includes leading research on cattle, soy and corn culture.

In agriculture, the state stands out in the production of coffee, sugar cane and soy, and also has large productions of orange, beans, sorghum, carrot, potato, banana, tangerine and strawberry, in addition to producing papaya, persimmon and cassava.

In 2020, Minas Gerais was the largest producer of Coffea arabica in the country, with 74% of the national total (1.9 million tons, or 31.2 million 60-kg bags). In 2017, Minas represented 54.3% of the total national production of coffee (first place).

The state was the third largest producer of sugar cane in Brazil in 2020, representing 11.1% of the total produced in the country, with 74.3 million tons.

The cultivation of soy, on the other hand, is increasing, however, it is not among the largest national producers of this grain. In the 2018–2019 harvest, Minas Gerais harvested 5 million tons (seventh place in the country). The state was the second largest producer of oranges in 2018, with a total of 948 thousand tons.

Minas Gerais is the second largest producer of beans in Brazil, with 17.2% of national production in 2020. In addition, it is one of the largest national producers of sorghum: around 30% of Brazilian production. It also ranks third in domestic production of cotton.

The state was the third largest producer of banana in 2018, with 766 thousand tons. Brazil was already the 2nd largest producer of the fruit in the world, currently in 3rd place, losing only to India and Ecuador.

In 2018, São Paulo and Minas Gerais were the largest producers of tangerine in Brazil. Minas was the 5th largest producer of papaya. About persimmon, Minas ranks third with 8%.

In 2019, in Brazil, there was a total production area of around 4 thousand hectares of strawberry. The largest producer is Minas Gerais, with approximately 1,500 hectares, cultivated in most municipalities in the extreme south of the state, in the Serra da Mantiqueira region, with Pouso Alegre and Estiva being the largest producers.

Regarding carrots, Brazil ranked fifth in the world ranking in 2016, with an annual production of around 760 thousand tons. In relation to the exports of this product, Brazil occupies the seventh world position. Minas Gerais is the largest producer in Brazil. Among the production centers in Minas Gerais are the municipalities of São Gotardo, Santa Juliana and Carandaí. As for potato, the main national producer is the state of Minas Gerais, with 32% of the total produced in the country. In 2017, Minas Gerais harvested around 1.3 million tons of the product. In the production of cassava, Brazil produced a total of 17.6 million tons in 2018. Minas was the 12th largest producer in the country, with almost 500 thousand tons.

Regarding the bovine herd, Minas has the second largest in the country. In 2015, it had a total of 23.8 million head of cattle.

Minas is the main producer of milk in Brazil, with the highest number of milked cows, responsible for 26.6% of production and 20.0% of total milking animals. The municipality of Patos de Minas was the second largest producer in 2017, with 191.3 million liters of milk. In 2015, the state produced 9.1 billion liters of milk.

In terms of pork meat, in 2017, Minas had the 4th largest herd in the country, with 5.2 million heads, 12.7% of the national total.

The state is the third largest producer of eggs in the country, with 9.3% of the Brazilian total in 2019 (which was 3.83 billion dozen).

Mineral extraction

The central region of the state (where the capital is located) has big reserves of iron (and to a lesser extent, gold) still being actively mined. In mineral production, in 2017, Minas Gerais was the country's largest producer of iron (277 million tons worth R$37.2 billion), gold (29.3 tons worth R$3.6 billion), zinc (400 thousand tons worth R$351 million) and niobium (in the form of hydrochloride) (131 thousand tons worth R$254 million). In addition, Minas Gerais was the second largest producer of bauxite (1.47 million tons at a value of R$105 million), the third of manganese (296 thousand tons worth R$32 million) and fifth of tin (206 tons worth R$4.7 million). There are also deposits of Verdete slate, a glauconite-bearing mineral. Minas Gerais had 47.19% of the value of the production of minerals marketed in Brazil (first place), with R$41.7 billion.

The state has the largest production of various precious and semi-precious stones in the country. In aquamarine, Minas Gerais produces the most valuable stones in the world. In diamond, Brazil was the largest diamond producer in the world from 1730 to 1870, mining occurred for the first time in the Serra da Canastra, region of Diamantina, even lowering the price of stone in everyone due to overproduction. Minas Gerais continues to mine diamonds, in addition to having larger or smaller scale productions of agate, emerald, garnet, jasper and sapphire. Topaz and tourmaline stand out. In topaz, Brazil has the most valuable variety in the world, imperial topaz, only produced in Ouro Preto. Furthermore, the country is the world's leading producer of topaz. It's also among the world's largest tourmaline producers.

In the steel industry, Brazilian crude steel production was 32.2 million tons in 2019. Minas Gerais represented 32.3% of the volume produced in the period, with 10,408 million tons, being the largest steel center. Among the steel companies in Minas Gerais are Usiminas, ArcelorMittal Aços Longos (formerly Belgo Mineira), Açominas (belonging to Gerdau), Vallourec & Mannesmann and Aperam South America.

Manufacturing

There are also large companies installed the automotive industry, as manufacturers FIAT in Betim, IVECO in Sete Lagoas, Mercedes-Benz and suppliers of auto-parts, as STOLA and USIPARTS. In Brazil, the automotive sector represents about 22% of the industrial GDP. Minas Gerais is the third largest vehicle producer in the country, with a 10.7% participation in 2019.

In the Electronics industry, the billing of industries in Brazil reached R$153 billion in 2019, around 3% of national GDP. The number of employees in the sector was 234.5 thousand people. Exports were $5.6 billion, and the country's imports were $32 billion. Brazil has two large electroelectronic production centers, located in the Metropolitan Region of Campinas, in the State of São Paulo, and in the Free Zone of Manaus, in the State of Amazonas. The country also has other smaller centers, one of them in the municipality of Santa Rita do Sapucaí, in Minas Gerais. In Santa Rita do Sapucaí, 8 thousand jobs are linked to the sector, with more than 120 companies. Most of them produce equipment for the telecommunications industry, such as decoders, including those used in the transmission of the digital television system. The company Multilaser has a plant in the city of Extrema.

In Food Industry, in 2019, Brazil was the second largest exporter of processed foods in the world, with a value of US$34.1 billion in exports. The income of the Brazilian food and beverage industry in 2019 was R$699.9 billion, 9.7% of the country's gross domestic product. In 2015, the food and beverage industry in Brazil comprised 34,800 companies (not including bakeries), the vast majority of which were small. These companies employed more than 1.6 million workers, making the food and beverage industry the largest employer in the manufacturing industry. There are around 570 large companies in Brazil, which concentrate a good part of the total industry income. Minas Gerais created food companies of national importance such as Itambé and Pif Paf Alimentos.

In the Footwear industry, in 2019 Brazil produced 972 million pairs. Exports were around 10%, reaching almost 125 million pairs. Brazil ranks fourth among world producers, behind China, India and Vietnam, and 11th among the largest exporters. Minas Gerais has a polo specialized in cheap shoes and sneakers in Nova Serrana. The city has around 830 industries, which in 2017 produced around 110 million pairs.

In Textile industry, Brazil, despite being among the 5 largest producers in the world in 2013, and being representative in the consumption of textiles and clothing, has little insertion in world trade. In 2015, Brazilian imports ranked 25th (US$5.5 billion). And in exports, it was only 40th in the world ranking. Brazil's share of world textile and clothing trade is only 0.3%, due to the difficulty of competing in price with producers from India and mainly from China. The gross value of production, which includes the consumption of intermediate goods and services, of the Brazilian textile industry corresponded to almost R $40 billion in 2015, 1.6% of the gross value of industrial production in Brazil. Minas Gerais has 8.51% (third largest production in the country).

Service industry
Tourism is also an important activity for the state: historical cities like Ouro Preto, Mariana, Sabará, Congonhas, Diamantina, Tiradentes, and São João del-Rei, are major attractions for visitors interested in their colonial architecture. Other cities, like Araxá, Poços de Caldas, Lambari, Caxambu, Lavras, and others, attract visitors interested in their mineral watersprings. Eco-tourism is a rising economic activity in the state, especially in localities situated on the several highlands that exist in Minas Gerais.

Tourism

One of the most important tourist circuits in Minas Gerais is the Estrada Real, which passes through the old roads used to transport gold from the mines, connecting the central region of the state with the cities of Rio de Janeiro and Parati. The different itineraries of this circuit present historical, cultural and natural attractions for its visitors. Another noteworthy aspect of tourism in Minas Gerais includes visits to historic cities, which preserve colonial museum buildings, in addition to including museums and cultural spaces that reveal the past of these places. Of these cities, Ouro Preto stands out, where the Museum of Inconfidência is located.

The relief of the state, with an abundance of peaks and mountains (especially the great peaks), in addition to the large number of grottos and caves, natural and artificial rivers and lakes, and the richness of the state's fauna and flora, attract practitioners. of ecotourism. and adventure tourism. Another relevant segment is rural tourism, since Minas is one of the states with the most developments for this purpose. In the central region of the state, in addition to the historic cities and the capital, there are national parks such as Serra do Cipó, as well as the Inhotim Museum, which has one of the largest collections of contemporary art in the country. In the south of the state, there is the Circuito das Águas, known for its mineral spas. São Lourenço and Poços de Caldas are cities famous for their spas, hot springs and thermal baths.

It also highlights business tourism, which is booming, since in recent years important events of international projection have been held in the state. In particular, the city of Belo Horizonte stands out in this segment, attracting more and more fairs, congresses and meetings, which can be attributed to the city's infrastructure and important hotel network. Other cities in the interior (such as Juiz de Fora, Uberaba and Uberlândia) also offer options for holding large business events.

Infrastructure

Highways

As of November 2020, the state of Minas Gerais had, in addition to municipal highways, 39,738 km of state and federal highways, of which 29,255 were paved and 2,505 km were duplicate highways. The state has duplicate highways that leave the capital Belo Horizonte and connect it with São Paulo (BR-381) and Rio de Janeiro (BR-040), and in its western part (BR-050, BR-153 and BR-365 in the area known as the Triângulo Mineiro, between the states of São Paulo and Goiás, near Uberaba and Uberlândia). Some parts of BR-262 are also duplicated. The state, however, presents, in general, a duplication deficit, with sections of a single lane with movement above the saturation limit. Recently, in 2022, a project was created to grant BR-381 to private initiative, with the intention of doubling 215 km between Belo Horizonte, Ipatinga and Novo Oriente de Minas.

Minas Gerais is the Brazilian state that harbors the highest mileage of highways. The state highway network is 269,545 kilometers, of which only 11,396 on federal roads and 21,472 on state highways and state coincide, corresponding to all other municipal roads. Because of its central position, the state is crossed by the most important national highways, like BR-116 (Rio-Bahia), BR-040 (Rio-Brasília) and others. Many of the most important Brazilian routes cross the state and, for this reason, it counts the greater proportion of car accidents per capita.

BR-122,
BR-040,
BR-135,
BR-146,
BR-251,
BR-259,
BR-265,
BR-265,
BR-265,
BR-265,
BR-267,
BR-352,
BR-354,
BR-356,
BR-356,
BR-364,
BR-367,
BR-367,
BR-367,
BR-381,
BR-381,
BR-383,
BR-383,
BR-393,
BR-459,
BR-462,
BR-464,
BR-491.

Railways 

Rail transport has been around since the 19th century, when the Central Railway of Brazil was built in 1860. In 1874, the Leopoldina Railway was inaugurated. In 1880 the Estrada de Ferro Oeste de Minas was founded and in the following decades several other railways were opened in the territory of Minas Gerais. Starting in the 1960s, railways began to be replaced by roads, due to the growing demand for the car fleet, which resulted in the closure of some railways and branches. In the 1990s, the entire national railway system was privatized, disabling the remaining passenger services on some local lines. However, there are still active railways that cross the Minas Gerais, today used only for freight, such as the old Central do Brasil Railway, Leopoldina Railway, Western Minas Railway and Steel Railway, operated by dealers. Railway Center. Atlantic. Vitória a Minas Railway (EFVM) is responsible for transporting the production of Vale and other state companies to the port of Tubarão, in Vitória, Espírito Santo, and also operates the only daily passenger train in Brazil that runs long distances, between Vitória and Belo Horizonte, which connects other cities that also have stations.

Airport

Tancredo Neves International Airport is located in the municipalities of Lagoa Santa and Confins, 38 km (23 mi) from Belo Horizonte, and was opened in January 1984. It was planned from the start for future expansion in steps to meet growing demand. The airport has one of the lowest rates of shutdown for bad weather in the country. However, the Confins airport was not using much of its capacity until 2005, when it was decided that a large part of the Pampulha Airport flights (which is smaller and located inside Belo Horizonte's urban area) would move to Confins.

The Tancredo Neves International Airport is currently the fifth busiest airport in the country, after Guarulhos, Congonhas, Brasília and Galeão. It is a main hub for Azul. In addition to direct flights to over 40 destinations in Brazil, it also has regular scheduled international services to Buenos Aires, Panama City, Miami and Lisbon.

In 2014 the airport was auctioned to the private sector. Renovations were concluded in 2016. A new terminal was built with 17 new jetways, increasing the airport's capacity to 22 million passengers a year and the runway is undergoing expansion. A new runway is planned to be built by 2020.

Administrative center
A new Administrative Center (Cidade Administrativa de Minas Gerais) was completed in March 2010, for the state of Minas Gerais. Designed by architect Oscar Niemeyer, the center consists of four large buildings on an 800,000 square meter site. Two buildings accommodate 17 of the state ministries, the third building consists of an auditorium, with capacity for 540 guests. The fourth building is the "Palacio do Governo", which is the world's largest suspended structure, built in reinforced concrete. The building has a 150m span, and its roof is supported by four columns.

Sports

As in the rest of Brazil, football is the most popular sport among locals. Pelé, widely considered the best footballer of all time, was born in the Minas city of Três Corações. Belo Horizonte is home to two of the most successful teams in the country, and the city also has one of the biggest football stadiums in the world, the Mineirão, opened in 1965. Reopened after renovations in 2013, Mineirão was chosen as one of the venues for the 2014 FIFA World Cup, and also the soccer tournament of the 2016 Summer Olympics. Another stadium in Belo Horizonte, Independência Stadium, was one of the venues of the 1950 FIFA World Cup, where it hosted a legendary upset of the United States team over England.

The biggest teams of Belo Horizonte and Minas as a whole are Atlético Mineiro, founded in 1908 and nicknamed "Galo" (rooster) after its mascot, and Cruzeiro, founded in 1921 as "Palestra Itália" by the members of the local Italian community - but renamed in the 1940s. Atlético won one edition of the Campeonato Brasileiro Série A in 1971, two CONMEBOL Cups (the predecessor of the current Copa Sudamericana), is the biggest winner of the State Championship with 41 titles, one title of the Libertadores Cup Champion in 2013 and one Copa do Brasil title in 2014. Cruzeiro won 36 state championships, won four times the Brazilian Championship, defeating Pelé's Santos in the 1966 Taça Brasil, the 2003 Campeonato Brasileiro Série A (which combined with a state championship and a Brazilian Cup in the same year lead to a treble named by Cruzeiro as "Triple Crown"), won the 2013 and 2014 national league. Cruzeiro has been one of Brazil's most successful clubs since the 1960s, being elected the most successful Brazilian team of the 20th century by IFFHS. Its titles include 4 editions of the Brazilian Cup, 4 Brazilian Championships and 2 Copa Libertadores in 1976 and 1997. Cruzeiro was relegated to the second division of the National League in 2019, while Atlético missed the 2006 edition, following a relegation in the previous year (2005).

Belo Horizonte is also home to América Mineiro, founded in 1912 current owner of Independência and considered the third force of the state. While the team's struggles combined with the popularization of Atlético and Cruzeiro reduced América's supporters, the team has won both the second and third levels of the Brazilian Championship, the Sul-Minas Cup in 2000, and 16 state championships, including a record dynasty of ten tournaments between 1916 and 1925. Both Villa Nova of Nova Lima and Betim Esporte Clube (when it was known as Ipatinga Futebol Clube) have won the state championship and been in Série A of the Brazilian league.

Besides football, Belo Horizonte has one of the largest attendances at volleyball matches in the whole country. Multisport club Minas Tênis Clube had its male and female teams win the Brazilian Superleague of Volleyball, with Contagem-based Sada Cruzeiro also winning the male tournament. Sada-Cruzeiro also won the FIVB World Club Championship two times in last 3 years, being one of the most successful volleyball team in the world. The Brazil national volleyball team has had some of its highest attendance numbers at Mineirinho, an arena located near the Mineirão stadium. On basketball, both Minas and Uberlândia's Uberlândia Tênis Clube are in the national tournament.

In the state, tennis players Marcelo Melo and Bruno Soares were born, who were respectively the nº1 and nº2 of the world in doubles; Ronaldo da Costa, former holder of the marathon world record;  Olympic medalists such as Maicon de Andrade en taekwondo, Marcus Mattioli in swimming, Moysés Blás and Cláudia Pastor in basketball; Adenízia da Silva, Ana Carolina da Silva, Ana Flávia Sanglard, Ana Paula Henkel, Anderson Rodrigues, Camila Brait, Érika Coimbra, Fabiana Claudino, Gabriela Guimarães, Giovane Gavio, Hilma, Marcia Fu, Xandó, Maurício Souza , Lucarelli, Sassá, Sheilla Castro, Talmo and Walewska in volleyball; so as World Championship medalists like André Cordeiro, Henrique Barbosa, Larissa Oliveira, Nicolas Oliveira, Rodrigo Castro and Teófilo Ferreira in swimming.

Communications
As of April 2007, there are 11.3 million mobile phones and 4.2 million telephones in the country.

Minas Gerais (MG) cities area phone codes (called DDD in Brazil) are from 31 to 38.

Culture

Minas Gerais may be called Deep Brazil by analogy with France profonde. It has a distinctly more native flavour than cosmopolitan São Paulo, a more traditional slant than flashy Rio de Janeiro, and is more Portuguese than the South and São Paulo with their great influx of Italians and other Central Europeans, the North with its Native Americans, or the Northeast with its heavy Afro-Brazilian influence.

People
Those born and raised in Minas Gerais, also called Mineiros, bear an unmistakable accent that sets them apart from fellow Brazilians, although people born in different regions of the state bear slightly different accents, some resembling those of neighboring states, such as São Paulo, Rio de Janeiro and Bahia. They are considered reserved, prudent, relatively silent to the point of melancholy but welcoming and family-focused. It is one of the most religious states, with a large proportion of staunch Roman Catholics and a burgeoning Evangelical and neo-Pentecostal population. The Spiritist doctrine is also professed by a significant portion of the population, partly due to the influence of Chico Xavier, the main spiritual icon of Brazil, who lived in Minas Gerais all his life.

Dialects 
The most spoken dialect (48,6%) in the state is mineiro. It is the dialect spoken in the capital, Belo Horizonte, and the historical cities (Ouro Preto, Mariana, Sabará, Diamantina, Tiradentes, São João del-Rei etc.).

Other dialects are caipira, spoken near the states of São Paulo and Goiás by 33,0%, and baiano, spoken in the Northern region - near Bahia - by 18,4%.

Museums

Mariano Procópio Museum, in Juiz de Fora, and Centro de Arte Contemporânea Inhotim, in Brumadinho, are among the most important cultural institutions.

Cuisine

Minas Gerais is known nationally for its cuisine. The cultural basis of its cuisine is the small farmhouse, and many of the dishes are prepared using locally produced vegetables and meats, especially chicken and pork. Traditional cooking is done using coal- or wood-fired ovens and cast iron pans, making for a particularly tasty flavor; some restaurant chains have adopted these techniques and made this type of food popular in other parts of the country.

Many of the cakes and appetizers of the local cuisine use corn or cassava (known there as mandioca) flour instead of wheat, as the latter did not adapt well to the local weather. The best-known dish from Minas Gerais is "pão de queijo", a small baked roll (known internationally as "Brazilian cheese rolls") made with cheese and cassava flour that can be served hot as an appetizer or for breakfast.

The state is also recognized for its doce de leite, since Minas Gerais is the largest producer of milk in the country. Minas Gerais is also Brazil's most traditional producer of cheese. Minas cheese is renowned nationwide as the distinct Brazilian cheese. Cachaça is also a local produce of high importance, with the state owning hundreds of artisanal factories (in Minas and in the neighboring state of São Paulo, there is the world's largest production of sugar cane, the basis of cachaça production). Typical of the state are Tropeiro beans with torresmo, Tutu de Feijão (Bean's Tutu), chicken with okra stew, handmade cheeses, goiabada, paçoca, pamonha, arroz com leite and others. Outside of Minas Gerais it is common to find restaurants specializing in food from the state.

The state cuisine is showcased in various festivals year round and in many locations throughout the state, but the biggest festival is the month-long Comida de Buteco in Belo Horizonte, where 41 bars and restaurants are selected to create a dish using ingredients traditional to local cuisine. People from all over the country and abroad rate the food, the temperature of the beer, the ambiance and service. In 2007, over 400,000 people participated in the festival according to Vox Populi statistics.

Galinhada is one of the specialities in Minas Gerais. It's basically rice cooked with chicken, corn and peas.

Music

Music is one of the most striking features of Minas Gerais and has been part of the history of the state since the early 16th and 17th centuries.

From the 18th century, composers including José Joaquim Emerico Lobo de Mesquita, Francisco Gomes da Rocha, Marcos Coelho Neto and Manoel de Oliveira Dias reinforced the musical tradition of Minas with the composition of baroque pieces that are now revered as masterpieces. For classical music, the state features productions and performances of various orchestras and choirs.Among them there are the Symphonic Orchestra of Minas Gerais and the Coral Lírico de Minas Gerais, a State Choir, maintained by Clovis Salgado Foundation, an institution linked to the Secretary of State for Culture. These and other groups have a strong presence in the capital and throughout the state, working for the popularization and democratization of classical music. One of the most prolific contemporary composers was born in Minas Gerais, Prof. Dr. Andersen Viana, which music has been recognized most frequently abroad.

The most varied rhythms and sounds have their origins in the state. Ary Barroso, who in 1939 composed one of Brazil's best known songs throughout the world, Aquarela do Brasil, was born in Ubá, in the Zona da Mata Mineira.

In the 1960s and 70s streets in the traditional neighborhood of Santa Tereza, Belo Horizonte, were the scene of one of the most important movements of national music: Clube da Esquina. With a unique blend of Brazilian popular music with pop and jazz, the club was met with talents like Milton Nascimento, Wagner Tiso, Toninho Horta, Fernando Brant, Lô Borges, Beto Guedes, and Flávio Venturini.

In the 1980s and 90s a scene of heavy metal bands has been held in Belo Horizonte. It is the origin of important Brazilian bands of this genre, many of them are known worldwide, such as Sepultura, Sarcófago, Overdose, Mutilator, Holocausto and Chakal.

The current scenario continues reflecting the vibrancy and dynamism of its culture. A new generation of artists is represented by names like Skank, Pato Fu, Jota Quest, Vander Lee, Uakti, Marina Machado, Maurício Tizumba, Berimbrown, Copo Lagoinha and Amaranto.

Moving freely through different rhythms like rock, reggae, heavy metal, samba and MPB, among others, the music in Minas Gerais continues the excellence and diversity that has always been a staple in the country.

The important International Festival of Colonial Brazilian Music and Ancient Music takes place in Juiz de Fora since 1989. Brazil's most prestigious dance company, Grupo Corpo is also from Minas Gerais, having its headquarters in Belo Horizonte.

Flag
The flag of the state of Minas Gerais is the oldest one adopted in Brazil that was devised by Brazilians. It was remembered by the Republican Party, which opposed the Brazilian Imperial Government, and adopted unofficially as the flag of the state. It has been the official state flag since 1963.

The flag's Latin inscription, "Libertas quæ sera tamen", means "Freedom albeit late", and was the motto of the Minas Gerais Conspiracy, which fought for Minas' independence from Portugal in the 18th century. The phrase was taken from Virgil's Eclogues 1.30. The triangle is said to represent the Holy Trinity. The colors were chosen for their revolutionary meaning: white represents the desire to form a peaceful nation, discarding all colonial institutions, and red the flame of liberty or the blood of the revolutionary martyrs such as Tiradentes.

Cities

In spite of not being the largest state of Brazil and ranking second in population, Minas Gerais has the largest number of cities. Of the more than 5,500 municipalities in the country, Minas has 853 of them, a fact explained by the number of inhabitants and by the vast territory, comparable in area to Madagascar and larger than Metropolitan France. The most notable cities are: the capital Belo Horizonte, Contagem, Betim, Juiz de Fora, Varginha, Muriaé, Montes Claros, Uberlândia, Governador Valadares, Ipatinga, Ouro Preto, Sete Lagoas, Uberaba, Araxá, Patos de Minas, Divinópolis, Barbacena, Pouso Alegre, Janaúba, Teófilo Otoni, Conselheiro Lafaiete, Mariana, Poços de Caldas and São João del-Rei.

Notes

References

External links

 Government of Minas Gerais website
 Legislative Assembly of Minas Gerais website
 Court of Justice of Minas Gerais website

 
States of Brazil